is a Japanese mixed-media project created by Gorō Taniguchi. An anime television series by Polygon Pictures titled Estab Life: Great Escape aired from April to June 2022 on Fuji TV's +Ultra programming block. An anime film also by Polygon Pictures titled Eiga Estab Life: Revengers' Road is set to premiere in 2023. A mobile game developed by Square Enix titled Estab Life: Unity Memories has also been announced.

Plot
The franchise takes place in the distant future when the world population has turned to decline, the H.D.E.D. (Human Diversity Experimental Department) conducted by the ecosystem management AI for the purpose of species prosperity, in addition to ordinary humans, beasts, and various races such as demons and cyborgs have been born. In addition, AI has created many areas surrounded by high walls called "clusters", and the culture, common sense, and values of each area have been formed. Tonkyork Metropolis (a portmanteau of New York City and Tokyo located in Kantō region) and Chicagosaka (a portmanteau of Chicago and Osaka located in Kansai region) during the work has become an experimental and futuristic city divided by clusters, and AI monitoring makes it impossible for people to come and go freely.

Characters

Estab Life: Great Escape

The leader of the Escape Shop Extractors, a mercenary group that helps clients escape their heavily-guarded clusters. When she is not doing an escape job, she is attending school at the Ochanomizu cluster and is the manager of Cafe Vostok. She has the power of precognition called Fatal Luck that allows her to see seconds into the future, and she uses that to plan out her escape tactics.

A member of the Escape Shop Extractors who is a “Gun Wizard”, able to cast spells that manipulate bullets. She is athletic and highly proficient with guns.

A humanoid slime girl who is a member of the Escape Shop Extractors. Her body is composed of several slime lifeforms. She has great affections towards Equa.

A robotic member of the Escape Shop Extractors. He is in charge of technical support for the team.

A wolf beastman who is a member of the Escape Shop Extractors. He only speaks in growls and barks and specializes in close combat.

Estab Life: Unity Memories

Estab Life: Revengers' Road

Media

Anime
The project by Gorō Taniguchi was originally announced on September 23, 2021, and was fully announced as a mixed-media project on January 20, 2022, with an anime television series by Polygon Pictures titled  that premiered on March 1, 2022, on the Japanese streaming service Fuji TV on Demand and aired from April 7 to June 23, 2022, on Fuji TV's +Ultra programming block, as well as an anime film directed and written by Taniguchi at Polygon Pictures titled , which is set to premiere in 2023. Hiroyuki Hashimoto is directing the television series, with Shoji Gatoh supervising and penning the series' scripts, Yūsuke Kozaki drafting the original character designs, Yoshiaki Fujisawa composing the series' music, and Slow Curve developing and producing the series. The opening theme song is "Rana" by Meychan, while the ending theme song is "0" by Good on the Reel. Crunchyroll licensed the series outside of Asia.

On April 11, 2022, Crunchyroll announced that the series will receive an English dub, which will premiere on April 20.

Episode list

Game
A mobile game titled developed by Square Enix for Android and iOS titled  has been announced. The game is a free-to-play MMORPG title with in-app purchases.

Notes

References

External links
Project official website 
 Game official website 
Official website on Crunchyroll

+Ultra
2022 anime television series debuts
Action anime and manga
Action video games
Alien invasions in television
Alien invasions in video games
Android (operating system) games
Animated television series about robots
Bandai Namco franchises
Comedy anime and manga
Crunchyroll anime
Espionage in anime and manga
Fiction about government
Girls with guns anime and manga
IOS games
Japan-exclusive video games
Japanese role-playing video games
Massively multiplayer online role-playing games
Mobile games
Polygon Pictures
Science fiction anime and manga
Science fiction video games
Spy video games
Square Enix franchises
Square Enix games
Superheroes in anime and manga
Superhero video games
Taito games
Television series about intelligence agencies
Television series set in the future
Television shows set in New York City
Television shows set in Tokyo
Terrorism in fiction
Upcoming video games
Video games set in the future
Video games set in Chicago
Video games set in New York City
Video games set in Osaka
Video games set in Tokyo
Video games developed in Japan